Newshub (stylised as Newshub.) is a New Zealand news service that airs on the television channels Three and Eden, as well as on digital platforms. It formerly operated across radio stations run by MediaWorks Radio until December 2021. The Newshub brand replaced 3 News service on the TV3 network and the Radio Live news service heard on MediaWorks Radio stations on 1 February 2016. In late 2020, MediaWorks sold Newshub to US multimedia company Discovery, Inc. (now Warner Bros. Discovery) The acquisition was completed on 1 December 2020.

History

MediaWorks
MediaWorks launched Newshub on 1 February 2016 as a multi-platform news service to replace the former 3 News service on its television channel Three and the Radio Live news service.

In March 2016, a Newshub journalist broke embargo and leaked sensitive information about a 25 basis point cut by the Reserve Bank to the Official Cash Rate (OCR). Newshub's parent company MediaWorks conducted their own investigation on the leak, and followed up with an apology from CEO Mark Weldon (former head of the New Zealand Stock exchange), although Weldon stopped short of naming the journalist involved. As a result of the loss of trust with the media, the Reserve Bank has elected to discontinue the media lockup prior to future releases of the OCR. In addition, the Reserve Bank banned MediaWorks journalists from all its future press conferences.

Discovery
On 7 September 2020, MediaWorks sold Newshub and its television arm to US multimedia company Discovery, Inc. At the time, Newshub was expected to continue providing bulletins to MediaWorks Radio, as well as producing the joint TV/radio program The AM Show. The acquisition of MediaWork's television arm was finalised on 1 December 2020, with the subsidiary being rebranded as Discovery New Zealand.

In mid-May 2021, Newshub closed its Dunedin office as part of parent company Discovery's restructuring of its business operations in Australia and New Zealand. The Dunedin newsroom consisted of reporter Dave Goosselink and camera operator Grant Findlay. Following the closure of the Dunedin office, the network's South Island operations consist of its Christchurch–based bureau as well as freelancers.

In early October 2021, Discovery NZ announced plans to launch a new Newshub Live at 8pm bulletin in March 2022 on its upcoming TV channel eden. Around the same time, it was announced that former owner Mediaworks would end its content supply agreement with Newshub, and establish its own radio newsroom employing over 20 news and sports journalists, editors and correspondents.

Newshub television bulletins

Newshub Live at 6pm
The flagship 6pm bulletin of Newshub is currently co-anchored by Mike McRoberts and Samantha Hayes. Newshub Live at 6pm replaced the news bulletin at the same time, previously known as 3 News at 6pm.

Newshub Late
Newshub Late is the late night edition of Newshub which usually airs weeknights around 10:30pm, but can run either earlier or later depending on the evening schedule. The show is currently anchored by Rebecca Wright

This is Three's fourth late news programme with the original programme being Nightline between 1990 and 2013, The Paul Henry Show in 2014 and Newsworthy in 2015. On 21 March 2022, an in-programme graphics revamp took place changing its set and format similar to the 8pm bulletin.

Newshub Live at 11:30am
Announced on 20 January 2021 and launched on 1 February 2021, Newshub Live at 11:30am, is the lunchtime edition of Newshub. The half hour bulletin is similar to Newshub Live at 4:30pm and also narrowed the previously large time gap between AM and the 4:30pm bulletin.

This is Three's third lunchtime news bulletin with the original bulletin being 3 News at 12 between 2007 and 2015 and Newshub Midday in 2016.

Newshub Live at 8pm
First aired on 21 March 2022, the bulletin airs on eden on weekdays at 8pm and is anchored by Rebecca Wright. The half hour bulletin covers exclusive interviews as well as the usual daily news in a nightly vibrant format similar to Newshub Late on Three. Newshub Live at 8pm has since been taken off air with its last show on 11 November 2022, within its first 12 months on air.

AM

A new breakfast television show began on Tuesday 8 February 2022, with the name changing to AM. The newly reformatted AM show is currently presented by Ryan Bridge, Melissa Chan-Green, Bernadine Oliver-Kerby and William Waiirua. It no longer airs on radio. AM currently broadcasts weekdays from 5:30-9am with Bernadine Oliver-Kerby anchoring AM Early from 5:30-6am.

AM Early

AM Early, a spin-off from the newly reformatted AM show, is a half hour bulletin from 5:30am-6am where Bernadine Oliver-Kerby updates New Zealanders on overnight news stories and business reports. Currently AM Early is being hosted by Oriini Kaipara due to Bernadine Oliver-Kerby taking an extended leave of absence due to health reasons.

The Project

The Project is a New Zealand current affairs show presented by Jesse Mulligan, Kanoa Lloyd, and Jeremy Corbett. It premiered on Three in early February 2017, and airs at 7pm for half an hour. The show replaced Story. Its format is taken from the Australian version, which is a ratings hit on Network 10.

Newshub Nation
Newshub Nation is Three's in-depth political current affairs show focusing on the major players and forces that shape New Zealand. The show is presented by Simon Shepherd and Rebecca Wright and airs on Saturdays at 9:30am and Sundays at 10am. Former co-host Emma Jolliff died on February 6, 2020.

Former TV3 news shows

3 News
The TV3 6pm news bulletin was known as 3 News or 3 News at 6pm up until 31 January 2016. 3 News was originally known as 3 National News and first went on air on Monday 27 November 1989 when TV3 began broadcasting. For the first year of broadcast, 3 National News was a thirty-minute bulletin screening at 6:30 pm, which the same time slot as Holmes on TV1. The original bulletin was presented by former BCNZ and TVNZ anchor Philip Sherry, joined by sportscaster Greg Clark and weathercaster Belinda Todd.

Among the reports in the first day's bulletin were:

 Marty McNamara reported on a man (Charles Coulam) appearing in court charged with murdering Monica Cantwell.
 Mark Jennings reported on an alleged stabbing of a motorcyclist in Timaru.
 Stephen Christensen reported on a lack of funding for education and interviewed Education Minister Phil Goff .
 Ian Wishart reported on law changes allowing traffic officers to enter private property and challenged drivers who were trying to evade traffic officers.
 Max Hayton reported on the 1989 Indian Election.
 Steve Barnes reported on political changes in Communist Czechoslovakia.
 Greg Clark reported on the victory of New Zealand horse Horlicks in the 1989 Japan Cup.
 1990 Commonwealth Games runner Peter O'Donoghue was interviewed by Stephen Stuart.
 Clint Brown previewed upcoming summer tennis.
 The final report, by Janet McIntyre, described TV3's launch party and the network's first day of operation.

In 1991 TV3 extended 3 National News to a 1-hour bulletin starting at 6pm, this occurred during the Gulf War but TV3 continued to screen a 1-hour bulletin following the war. TV3 used their 1-hour news bulletin of 3 National News as a selling point over One Network News which was still a 30-minute bulletin followed by the Holmes show, One Network News did not become a 1-hour bulletin until 1995. During the nine years that the bulletin was known as 3 National News it had three different hosts. Original presenter Philip Sherry was replaced by Joanna Paul in mid-1990; Paul had previously been the presenter of the launch news update and weekend bulletins. When Paul opted not to renew her contract with the network, TV3 hired former TVNZ newsreader and It's in the Bag game show host, John Hawkesby.

On 16 February 1998, TV3 revamped its presentation, shortening the show's name to 3 News and adding another presenter. They initially planned for Hawkesby and ex-TVNZ journalist Carol Hirschfeld to co-present. The planned Hawkesby-Hirschfeld team never eventuated, with John Campbell taking the male presenter role when Hawkesby walked out of TV3 to host One News. TV3 later sued TVNZ for "interfering with the relationship" between Hawkesby and TV3. The two parties settled out of court at the end of 2000 for an undisclosed amount.

In 2005, Hirschfeld and Campbell left their presenting positions to collaborate on current affairs show Campbell Live. They were replaced by Hilary Barry and Mike McRoberts. The same year, 3 News won the Best News Award at the Qantas Television Awards. In 2005, TV3's parent company Mediaworks New Zealand launched Radio Live.

In 2007, the Australian capital investment firm Ironbridge Capital acquired TV3 and established MediaWorks New Zealand, which became 3 News' parent company. A new 3 News studio set began use on 15 September 2008, this coincided with an updated graphics package using the 2005 – 2008 graphics as its base. On 4 July 2011, 3 News revamped its presentation package starting with the early morning show of the time Firstline, to have the "floating tiles" look, which was in use up till the launch of Newshub on 1 February 2016.

In November 2012, 3 News won the Best News award at the 2012 New Zealand Television Awards.

On 27 January 2014, 3 News refreshed its split screen graphic, finance graphics and full frame graphics. At the same time, 3 News also updated their printed fake newsroom backdrop which they used while they temporarily broadcast from a green/blue screen set.

In early April 2015, it was announced that 3 News' Sunday bulletin would be reduced to half an hour and would be followed by a shortened version of the network's midweek current affairs programme 3rd Degree, which was later renamed "3D". The first of these shortened Sunday bulletins was broadcast on 24 May 2015.

On 19 December 2015, Studio 1 was decommissioned temporarily to prepare the studio for the launch of Newshub. During the refit of Studio 1, they broadcast from a green screen studio placed in the Paul Henry show set during the summer off-air time.

The last 3 News broadcast occurred on 31 January 2016 before the news brand renamed to Newshub.
The new look Studio 1 launched on 1 February 2016 designed by Jago Design, who also designed Studio 3, which is used for Paul Henry.

The Paul Henry Show
Paul Henry was a cross-platform, morning breakfast news programme broadcast live on TV3 and Radio Live on weekdays between 6:00am and 9:00am. It was presented by Paul Henry with Ingrid Hipkiss as news presenter, and Jim Kayes as sports presenter. The show began to air on 7 April 2015 (replacing Firstline) and retained its name after other 3 News shows were renamed to Newshub.

Story

Story was a 30-minute current affairs show presented by Duncan Garner and Heather du Plessis-Allan. The show aired Monday to Thursday nights at 7:00 pm, with a less formal chat / entertainment show on Friday evenings at 7 pm. Story was first launched on 10 August 2015 and replaced Campbell Live. On 16 December 2016, Story had its final show. Storys frontman, Duncan Garner, and co-host, Amanda Gillies, moved to the breakfast timeslot, for The AM Show.

Campbell Live

Campbell Live was a half-hour-long New Zealand current affairs programme that was broadcast on weeknights on TV3 at 7:00 pm (following 3 News) and was presented by New Zealand television personality, John Campbell. It was first broadcast on 21 March 2005 and had its last show broadcast on Friday, 29 May 2015. It was replaced with Story that screened on Monday through Thursday nights, presented by Duncan Garner and Heather du-Plessis Allan.

Nightline
Nightline was the late night edition of 3 News broadcast. It was broadcast live on TV3 at approximately 10:30 pm and was presented by Sacha McNeil. The show concluded on 20 December 2013, being replaced on 27 January 2014 with The Paul Henry Show, of which the final show aired on 19 December 2014. However an interim replacement simply named 3 News was aired for several weeks at the beginning of 2014, and again in 2015 (before Newsworthy began) and 2016 (before Newshub Late began).

Firstline

Firstline was a morning news programme produced by 3 News. The show was cancelled in April 2015 and was replaced by Paul Henry. It was presented by Rachel Smalley, with Sam Ackerman as the sports presenter. The show began on Monday 7 March 2011 off the back of ongoing Christchurch earthquake coverage.

Paul Henry

The Paul Henry Show was a weekday late night news & entertainment programme presented by Paul Henry. The show discussed the day's news with Henry's trademark take on events and also featured Janika ter Ellen as news presenter. Airing from 27 January to 19 December 2014, the show replaced the former Nightline in the late night weekday slot., It was replaced by Newsworthy.

Newsworthy
Newsworthy was the late night edition of 3 News in 2015 and broadcast live on TV3 at around 10:30 pm. It was presented by Samantha Hayes and David Farrier. The show started on 8 June 2015 with mixed reviews, and the final show was broadcast on 18 December 2015.

Sports Tonight
Sports Tonight was a sports information programme, broadcast live on TV3 weeknights following Nightline. Sports Tonight was presented by 3 News sports journalist Howard Dobson. The show was cancelled at the end of 2012, and its last programme aired on 21 December 2012.

60 Minutes
60 Minutes New Zealand was the local arm of the popular television franchise 60 Minutes. It was broadcast on Sunday evenings at 7:30 pm. The programme was presented by 3 News anchor Mike McRoberts. The programme was cancelled at the end of 2012.

3D
3D, originally named 3rd Degree, was created as a replacement for 60 Minutes. It was presented by Duncan Garner and Guyon Espiner. It was later changed to a half-hour format and renamed 3D Investigates. Presented by Duncan Garner and Samantha Hayes, it was TV3's flagship weekly current affairs programme, featuring stories from some of New Zealand's top journalists, including Paula Penfold, Sarah Hall, Melanie Reid, Phil Vine and Samantha Hayes.

3D brought a human face to the issues that mattered to Kiwis, confronting the people who needed to be confronted, probing the secrets that needed to be uncovered, and celebrated New Zealanders who were living extraordinary lives. At the end of 2015 3D was cancelled.

The Vote
The Vote was produced by TV3's News and Current Affairs division with funding from NZ On Air.  It screened once every four weeks in the same time slot as 3rd Degree (later 3D), TV3's former one-hour current affairs programme. The Vote was cancelled at the end of 2013.

Three60
Three60 was (at the time) TV3's newest current affairs show which focused on international news, politics & business. Three60 was presented by Newshub anchor Mike McRoberts and airs on Sundays at 9:30am. The show has since been cancelled.

Newshub Midday
Newshub Midday (formerly 3 News @ 12) was a half-hour bulletin broadcast live on TV3 weekdays at 12:00 pm. The show was presented by Jeff McTainsh.

Newshub Midday was axed in June 2016, airing its last show on 1 July that year. It was replaced by a digital current affairs bulletin called Newshub Explains, which began on 18 July 2016.

Newshub Midday returned as Newshub live at 11:30am on 1 February 2021 airing every weekday.

The AM Show

The AM Show was a New Zealand morning news and talk show that airs on Three and simulcast on Magic Talk. It was presented by Duncan Garner and, later, Ryan Bridge, with news anchor Amanda Gillies and sports anchor Mark Richardson, who both announced that they would leave The AM Show in December 2021.

Both Amanda Gillies and Mark Richardson left The AM Show for different opportunities at Discovery. Gillies left the show to take up the role as Newshub's national correspondent and Richardson would continue as the host of The Block NZ and would appear as a fourth host on The Project. Richardson currently co-hosts an afternoon show on Today FM with Leah Panapa.

The show replaced Paul Henry after it was announced the frontman of the show, Paul Henry, was resigning and therefore the show was going to be replaced. The announcement was made by MediaWorks in November 2016, and Paul Henry last aired on 16 December 2016. The AM Show premiered on 13 February 2017.

In 2022, The AM Show was rebranded as and refreshed into AM with new hosts Ryan Bridge and Melissa Chan-Green, news anchor Bernadine Oliver-Kerby and weather presenter William Waiirua.

Newshub Live at 4:30pm
Launched on 20 March 2017, as Newshub Live at 4pm, the half hour bulletin and mid-afternoon edition of Newshub airs weekdays at 4:30pm and is anchored by Oriini Kaipara. It was aired at 4pm until 16 August 2019, where it moved to the current timeslot of 4:30pm. The bulletin was discontinued in late 2022, with the final airing on 11 November 2022.

Newshub Breaking News Specials
Newshub Breaking News Specials are often aired during local and international, one-off and breaking news events. Newshub has aired specials for the following events:

During the COVID-19 pandemic in New Zealand a Newshub Special was broadcast most days at 1pm. During the broadcast former Director-General of Health, Dr Ashley Bloomfield would provide an update on how many new coronavirus cases were detected in New Zealand.

Newshub journalists

References

External links

First 3 News bulletin

1989 New Zealand television series debuts
1980s New Zealand television series
1990s New Zealand television series
2000s New Zealand television series
2010s New Zealand television series
2020s New Zealand television series
English-language television shows
New Zealand television news shows
Three (TV channel) original programming